Sanjiv Mehta (born 1959/1960) is an Indian business executive, and the chairman and managing director (MD) of Hindustan Unilever Limited, India’s largest Fast Moving Consumer Goods (FMCG) Company and the top five most valuable companies in the country. Mehta became the CEO and MD of Hindustan Unilever in October 2013, and in June 2018 was appointed as the chairman and MD. He also heads Unilever's business in South Asia, as cluster president encompassing businesses in India, Pakistan, Bangladesh, Sri Lanka and Nepal. Mehta is a member of the Unilever Leadership Executive, its global executive board.

Education
Born in Kanpur, Mehta studied in Mumbai and Nagpur. He is a chartered accountant from the Institute of Chartered Accountants of India and later completed the Advanced Management Programme from the Harvard Business School.

Career 
He began his career in 1983 with Union Carbide.  Early in his career, he was part of the crisis management team that worked on the Bhopal Gas tragedy in 1984. Since then, to date, he has been known to start most meetings by reviewing the safety agenda. In 1998, he joined the board of Unilever Bangladesh as its commercial director. In April 2002 he was appointed as the chairman and managing director of Unilever Bangladesh. Under his leadership, Unilever Bangladesh went on to become the crown jewel of Unilever's parent company given its competitive growth and stellar performance. In 2007, he moved to Manila as the chairman of Unilever Philippines, and in 2008 was appointed as the chairman of Unilever North Africa and Middle East (NAME). In 2013, he took over Unilever's business in India and South Asia, as Chairman and MD of Hindustan Unilever (HUL).

Under his leadership, in seven years HUL's market capitalisation increased from $17 billion to over $70 billion, making HUL the top five most valuable companies in India, as well as Asia's largest consumer staples company. HUL is now the second-largest Unilever business in the world.

With Sanjiv at the helm of the company, HUL has won several awards, including prestigious Economic Times' Company of the Year' & 'Corporate Citizen of the Year' awards, Business Standard's 'Company of the year' award and the Asian Centre for Corporate Governance and Sustainability's 'Best Governed Company'. Forbes has also rated HUL the 8th most innovative company  in the world and the most innovative company in India. A global study by Aon Hewitt ranked HUL as the 3rd best Company globally for building leaders behind GE and IBM.

Mehta is a firm believer of "doing well by doing good". Under him HUL has taken on and expanded several initiatives that have a far-reaching societal and environmental impact. Through the Hindustan Unilever Foundation and its community partners, water potential of more than 1.3 trillion litres has been created by democratizing water management in villages across India. Further, under the Shakti program, over 136 thousand Shakti women entrepreneurs have been empowered in rural India. Other than that HUL's ongoing health and hygiene initiatives have impacted more than 154 million people all over the country.

In 2021, Sanjiv took over as the President of Federation of Indian Chambers of Commerce and Industry, India's largest and oldest apex business organizations.

Personal life
Mehta grew up in Mumbai and is the son of SP Mehta and Anita Mehta. His parents were uprooted during the partition of India. His father was a retired senior executive with Reserve Bank of India. He is married to Mona Mehta, who too is a chartered accountant and they have twin daughters Naina and Roshni who have studied at Cornell, MIT and Harvard University respectively.

Boards
Ex-President of FICCI

Non-Executive Independent Board member of Air India Limited, TATA Group since 2022

Member of South Asia Advisory Board of Harvard Business School

Co-chairs the Advisory Network to the High-Level Panel for a ‘Sustainable Ocean Economy’ 

Chairs ‘Vikaasa’, a coalition of top Indian and MNC companies 

Director of Board of Indian School of Business 

Member of the Breach Candy Hospital Trust

Awards and recognition

2004, Business Executive of the Year - American Chamber of Commerce Dhaka 
May 2016, 'The Outstanding CEO of the Year'  at the 3rd edition of the CEO AWARDS 2016 organised by CEO INDIA magazine
January 2017, 'Management Man of the Year' award from Bombay Management Association
January 2018, Business Leader award from the Institute of Chartered Accountants of India
November 2018, Economic Times Award 2018 for Corporate Citizen
November 2018, Best CEO Multinational - Forbes India 
March 2019, Honorary Degree - Doctor of Philosophy in Business Management from  Xavier Institute of Management, Bhubaneswar
2019, “Business Leader” of the year award by All India Management Association
January 2019, Industry Role Model - Lokmat's Most Stylish Awards
2019, Best Transformational Leader - Asian Centre for Corporate Governance and Sustainability 
2019, Business Leader of the Year - The Economic Times 
2020, Pralhad P. Chhabria Memorial Global Award - Priyadarshni Academy 
2021, Sir Jehangir Ghandy Medal for Industrial and Social Peace - Xavier Institute of Management (XLRI)
2021, JRD Tata Corporate Leadership Award - All India Management Association (AIMA)
2021, Best CEO Medium Company Category - Business Today

References

Living people
Indian accountants
Indian chief executives
Year of birth missing (living people)
Unilever people